Vollmar may refer to:

Fritz Vollmar
Heinz Vollmar (1936–1987), German football player
Jocelyn Vollmar (born 1925), American ballerina
Klausbernd Vollmar (born 1946), German scientific psychologist
Georg von Vollmar (1850–1922), German socialist politician
Folmar of Karden (also spelled Vollmar), (circa 1135–1189), Archbishop of Trier
King Goldemar (King Vollmar), dwarf king from German mythology

See also
Volmar
Vollmer
Folmar (disambiguation)